Arrington may refer to:

Places
Arrington, Cambridgeshire, a village in England
 Arrington, Kansas
Arrington, Virginia
Arrington Township, Wayne County, Illinois
Arrington, Tennessee
Arrington Ice Arena, arena on the campus of Adrian College

People with the surname

Football players
LaVar Arrington (born 1978), American football player
J. J. Arrington (born 1983), American football player
Adrian Arrington (born 1985), American football player
Dick Arrington (1942–1993), American football guard
Rick Arrington (born 1947), American football player
Kyle Arrington (born 1986), American football player
Arrington Jones (born 1959), American football player

Politicians
Richard Arrington Jr. (born 1934), American politician
Richard Olney Arrington (1897–1963), Justice of the Supreme Court of Mississippi 
Arrington Dixon, American politician
Archibald Hunter Arrington (1809–1872), American former Congressman
Archibald Hunter Arrington Williams (1842–1895), American former Congressman
Jodey Arrington (born 1972), American politician, current Congressman for Texas's 19th congressional district
John B. Arrington (1919–2001), American politician
Katie Arrington (born 1970), American politician
Marvin S. Arrington Sr. (born 1941), American judge and politician
W. Russell Arrington (1906–1979), American politician

Musicians
Steve Arrington (born 1956), American musician
Charisse Arrington, R&B singer
Joe Tex (born Joseph Arrington Jr., 1935–1982), American songwriter
Vast Aire (born Theodore Arrington, born 1978), American rap artist and part of group Cannibal Ox
Arrington de Dionyso (born 1970s), Washington-based artist and experimental musician

Race car drivers
Buddy Arrington (born 1938), American race car driver
Joey Arrington (born 1956), American race car driver

Other
Michael Arrington (born 1970), American venture capital and start-up technology blogger
John Arrington, American physicist
Leonard J. Arrington (1917–1999), American religious author
Jill Arrington (born 1972), American football reporter
Robert Arrington (born 1938), American philosopher
Marie Dean Arrington (1933–2014), American criminal

Alanna Arrington (born 1998), American model
Elayne Arrington, American mathematician and engineer
James Arrington, American stage actor, director, playwright and scholar
Yasmine Arrington (born 1993), businessman
 Kristi Arrington, American professional golfer
 Lillie Arrington, American stage actress
 Nyesha Arrington, reality show contestant